The Newport was a name used by Chrysler for both a hardtop body designation and also for its lowest priced model between 1961 and 1981. Chrysler first used the Newport name on a 1940 show car, of which five vehicles were produced. The Newport continued the tradition of a large, comfortable luxurious coupe and sedan, while offering a modestly priced product in comparison to the Chrysler New Yorker and Chrysler Imperial. The Newport gradually replaced the Chrysler Windsor which originally replaced the Chrysler Royal. The Newport was initially the brand name for the Windsor with a hardtop body style, then was used for coupes, sedans and station wagons in later decades.

1940s 

The first Newport, known as the Chrysler Newport Phaeton, was produced during 1940 and 1941. It was a dual-cowl phaeton that used the  Chrysler Straight Eight "Spitfire" engine with dual carburetors coupled to a three-speed manual transmission. The Newport was based upon the Chrysler Imperial Crown chassis and engine, and was designed by LeBaron / Briggs Manufacturing Company designer Ralph Roberts. Only six were built. Actress Lana Turner owned a Newport Phaeton, as did Chrysler founder Walter Chrysler, who used it as a personal car.

Five Newport Phaeton are known to exist today, while five Thunderbolts also show to have been manufactured, sharing the  chassis and mechanicals with the Chrysler New Yorker. Futuristic features that were shared with both the Thunderbolt and the Newport Phaeton were electro-hydraulic doors, electric windows and covered headlights. The interior was particularly plush with leather upholstery and a bespoke aluminum dashboard. The chassis of the New Yorker was necessary to store the one-piece retractable top in the rear storage area for the Thunderbolt while a canvas top was used for the Newport Phaeton. The Thunderbolt was not installed with a traditional grille and instead received airflow to the radiator from below the bumper, in a bottom breather fashion. The roundness of both vehicles shows influences of an appearance during that time that was called "ponton" styling.

The Newport Phaeton served as the pace car for the 1941 Indianapolis 500 race. This pace car, chassis number C7807503, was the only one that did not have hide-away headlights and became the personal property of Walter P. Chrysler Jr. after the race. Photos of the car can be found here.

1950 to 1960 

The 1949 Town and Country was first proposed as a hardtop, however the body style only appeared in the model's final year in 1950, followed by the Town and Country nameplate designated for station wagons only in 1951. Chrysler did briefly offer a hardtop coupe under the Town and Country labeled the "Custom Club Coupe" in 1946 but very few were manufactured. In 1950, the Newport name was used to designate the two-door hardtop (no B-pillar) body style in Chrysler's lineup, to include the Windsor, Saratoga, New Yorker and Imperial, while DeSoto also offered the hardtop using the Sportsman nameplate, and Dodge used the nameplate Lancer.

In 1955 a hardtop was introduced as the Imperial Newport for one year, while the nameplate continued to be offered on the Windsor Newport, Saratoga Newport and New Yorker Newport. In 1956 the model name was updated to identify two-door and four-door hardtops except for the Chrysler 300 lettered cars which were only available as a two-door hardtop or convertible. Imperial continued to offer a hardtop also starting in 1956, but to distinguish it from other Chrysler products, the Imperial hardtop was renamed Southampton until 1963. Briefly in 1955, Chrysler used the nameplates St. Regis for the New Yorker and Nassau for the Windsor hardtops with two-tone paint schemes but ended the practice in 1956.

1961–1964 

Chrysler updated the Newport nameplate as a separate model for 1961, and starting with 1960, all Chrysler models adopted the grille appearance from the Chrysler 300F. At a base price of $2,964 ($ in  dollars ), the Newport was the least expensive Chrysler model, intended to appeal to owners of the discontinued DeSoto brand. While the Newport was successful and comprised the bulk of Chrysler production, the base Newport sedans were modest trim package versions of Chrysler's traditional upscale models, featuring smaller hubcaps instead of full-wheel covers, plain interiors and a minimal amount of exterior trim. By contrast, the next model up, the New Yorker, retailed for $4,870 ($ in  dollars ) Advertising took pains to emphasize the Newport was not a compact car, describing it as "a full-size Chrysler in a new lower price range" and using "no jr. editions" as a tagline.

In 1961, the Newport was available as a two-door convertible, two-door hardtop, four-door sedan, four-door hardtop and four-door station wagon. All Newports could have been ordered with the 413 either single or dual four-bbl carbs and most of the 300 letter car options, except the four bucket seats, center console, and tachometer. A three-speed manual transmission was standard, but seldom ordered. The dash had been designed with Chrysler's push-button controls for the TorqueFlite automatic in mind, with the "AstraDome" instrument cluster covering the part of the steering column a column shifter would come out from under then-standard practice, so manual cars used a floor shifter. Due to the installation of the "AstraDome" instrument cluster extending outward towards the steering wheel, the traditional installation of the turn signal lever was relocated to the dashboard underneath the TorqueFlite pushbutton gear selectors and was installed as a sliding lever that would return to center as the steering wheel returned to the center position.

Station wagons from 1961 through 1964 featured hardtop body styling, with no "B" pillar. The canted headlight approach was previously used by Lincoln, and briefly by Buick, but by 1961 when this generation was introduced the feature was unique to Chrysler.

Because the program to create all-new Chryslers for 1962 was abruptly canceled in 1960, all of the 1962 Newport models, with the exception of the Town & Country station wagon, were instead created by taking the front end of a 1961 Newport (updated for 1962) and mating it to the de-finned body of a corresponding 1961 Dodge Polara model. The 1961 Polara's existing tailfins and taillights were replaced by redesigned rear-quarter panels which furnished the 1962 Newports with finless rear fenders and new taillights. In a similar fashion, the 1962 Newport Town & Country station wagon was created by mating the updated front end of a 1961 Newport to the body of a 1961 Plymouth Suburban 4-door station wagon. A Plymouth wagon was chosen because it was Chrysler Corporation's only finless full-sized station wagon.

The Newport was restyled alongside the New Yorker and Chrysler 300 for 1963, with this body style continuing for 1964.
The 1963 model year was a major restyle without any tail fins. The 1964s saw the return of small, chrome-topped fins.

1965–1968 

The 1965 Newport was built on an all-new Chrysler C platform, shared with the 300 and New Yorker, along with the Dodge Polara and Plymouth Fury. All body styles were continued from 1964 including the pillared four-door sedan, four-door hardtop sedan, two-door hardtop coupe, and convertible, along with the station wagon, which was renamed the Chrysler Town and Country and became a separate series. A new bodystyle for 1965 (shared with other Chryslers and Dodge Polaras) was a six-window Town Sedan that included a small side-window in the pillar similar to the three-window design of 1950s cars. This design would later return in the 1970s.

The standard transmission was a three-speed column shifted manual and optionally available was the three-speed Torqueflite automatic transmission, now featuring a column-mounted shifter replacing the pushbuttons of previous years as was changeover on all 1965 model year Chrysler Corporation cars and trucks.

Interiors featured padded instrument panels, full carpeting and choices of cloth-and-vinyl or all-vinyl bench seats and notchback bench seats with armrest. Newport coupes and convertibles were also offered with optional bucket seats with either a center console and floor shifter or armrest and center cushion.

The 1966 Newport received new grille work and revised taillights, but was otherwise changed very little from 1965. New this year was Chrysler's  V8 that was available in a high-output TNT version with four-barrel carburetor, dual exhausts, and dual-snorkel air cleaner.

For 1967, the Newport and other Chryslers received new sheet metal, but retained the basic 1965 bodyshell. Two-door hardtops received a new angular semi-fastback roofline featuring reverse-slant side windows while the rooflines of four-door pillared and hardtop sedans, and station wagons were unchanged. The slow-selling six-window Town Sedan was dropped this year.

New to the Newport line for 1967 was a more luxurious Newport Custom series available in four-door pillared and hardtop sedans, along with the two-door hardtop.

The 1968 Newport received only a minor facelift from its 1967 counterpart including new grilles and taillights. All body styles were carried over on both the base Newport and Newport Custom lines.

A mid-year offering on the Newport hardtop coupe and convertible was the Sportsgrain option similar to the simulated woodgrain exterior bodyside trim on the Town and Country station wagons of this period. The Sportsgrain Newport was intended to bring back the spirit of the late 1940s Town and Country convertibles but amounted to little more than a regular Newport as there were no other modifications and interior trims were the same as standard Newports. Production of the 1968 Sportsgrain Newports amounted to 965 hardtops and 175 convertibles. The Sportsgrain option returned for the redesigned 1969 Newport two-door hardtop and convertible; however, orders for the option were so low that Chrysler did not release their production totals.

Mercury tried a similar approach to the Sportsgrain Newport in 1968 by offering woodgrain "Yacht Deck Paneling" as an option on its Park Lane coupes and convertibles, which also did not experience significant consumer demand.

1969–1973 

The Newport was completely redesigned again for 1969, and featured the distinctive "Fuselage Styling" that would become symbolic of Chrysler's full-size cars until the end of the 1973 model year. Although retaining the same  wheelbase that it shared with the premium New Yorker, this generation Newport was longer, lower, wider, and several hundred pounds heavier than the 1965–1968 Newports.

Although still offered in 2-door and 4-door hardtop, 2-door convertible, and 4-door sedan models, station wagons were no longer part of the Newport series, as the Town & Country became a separate model outright. Newport convertibles were discontinued after 1970, following a drop in sales of 48 percent that year, to 1124 convertibles; while total Newport sales were down almost 30 percent, to 110,292 units, despite the restyling.

Available in 2- and 4-door hardtops and 4-door sedans, the Newport Custom would still be offered as the top-line Newport through the entire 1969–1973 design cycle. First appearing in 1971, the Newport Royal was an entry-level model in the Newport Series. It borrowed the name of the entry-level Chrysler from 1937–50. The Newport Royal name was discontinued for the 1973 model year and the Newport became the base model Chrysler. For 1970 a special appearance trim package was introduced on the 2- and 4-door hardtop called the Newport Cordoba

For 1972, the Royal came standard with the   V8, with larger-displacement engines unavailable, while the Custom was standard with the   V8, and the  single- and  dual-exhaust  V8s were optional. Power output would steadily decrease on all engines during this generation due to stricter emissions standards and rising fuel prices.

1974–1978 

The Newport was redesigned for the 1974 model year, along with all other full-size C-body cars. This generation shed the sweeping "fuselage" styling, in favor of more crisper, slab-sided styling. Despite losing several inches in length, 1974–1978 Newports were some of the heaviest cars ever produced by Chrysler. Their introduction coincided with the 1973 OPEC oil embargo, and sales of all full-size cars plummeted. The Chrysler Corporation was especially hit hard, as no smaller cars were sold under the Chrysler brand.

A design change was made in 1976 to the rear of the car. The former vertical style tail lights were replaced by a set that stretched out horizontally across the back of the car. The license plate was moved to the bumper but the fuel cap remained in the same place. However a new fuel door sat between the new tail lights, previous models had the fuel cap behind the license plate.

Production of the C-body Newport ended in 1978, along with the Chrysler New Yorker. Related Dodge and Plymouth C-body cars, as well as C-body Chrysler Town & Country station wagons had all been dropped the previous year. The 1978 Newport and New Yorker offered the American car industry's last true two-door and four-door hardtops; all four-doors and Newport coupes were hardtops, the pillared sedan also having been dropped.

1979–1981 

The 1979 model year saw a new downsized Newport on the Chrysler R platform, a derivative of the circa 1962 Chrysler B platform. This reduced model availability to a single "pillared hardtop" 4-door sedan. While GM and Ford had downsized their big cars by engineering smaller bodies around more spacious passenger accommodations, Chrysler took a different approach. The existing Chrysler B platform was modified to improve fuel efficiency through a number of weight saving measures. Examples include plastic brake wheel cylinder pistons, which tended to swell and bind up the brakes after a some years in service. Chrome-plated aluminum bumpers were another innovation, but were replaced in 1980 with a stronger steel rear bumper. The large displacement V8 engines were dropped.

Initial 1979 sales were strong (with a large portion of Newport sales going for fleet use), but Chrysler's unsteady financial condition, combined with the 1980 addition of the Plymouth Gran Fury, tightening oil and gasoline supplies hurt sales of the redesigned vehicle, and all of the R-body models were discontinued after a short run of 1981 models, as Chrysler began its shift toward smaller front-wheel drive cars. During this time the Early 1980s recession in the United States began to take effect and impact sales.

Cancelled revival, 1984 

The Newport model name nearly made a comeback in early 1984 as a more affordable version of the Fifth Avenue,  but at the last minute, the would-be Newport was marketed as the Dodge Diplomat SE, a premium version of that line. This model used the same waterfall grille as the Fifth Avenue with the exception of a horizontal bar running across the center to mimic the other "crosshair" grilles in the Dodge lineup.

References

External links 

 Information on the Newport Phaeton
 Allpar.com page on the Chrysler C-body
 1969–1973 Chrysler Newport at Fuselage.de site
 Chrysler Newport at The Crittenden Automotive Library

Newport
Rear-wheel-drive vehicles
Police vehicles
Full-size vehicles
Convertibles
Coupés
Sedans
Station wagons
1960s cars
1970s cars
1980s cars